Monsieur Coccinelle is a 1938 French comedy film directed by Dominique Bernard-Deschamps and starring Pierre Larquey, Jane Loury and Jeanne Provost.

The film's sets were designed by Boris Bilinsky. The plot was based on an original story written by Bernard-Deschamps himself. It is notable for its break with conventional realism, with several scenes that push towards outright fantasy.

The film had trouble securing distribution and initially premiered at an art house venue. It was only during wartime, when it benefited from a national shortage of films, that it received a general release.

Synopsis
An average worker who feels downtrodden at work and home, dreams of becoming a dictator. His aunt has her own fantasy that the love-of-her-life, a fairground magician, will return to her once more.

Main cast
 Pierre Larquey as Alfred Coccinelle  
 Jane Loury as Mélanie Coccinelle  
 Jeanne Provost as La tante Aurore  
 René Bergeron as Dutac  
 Yette Lucas as Hortense Dupont  
 Marcel Pérès as Brutus Dupont  
 René Fluet as Un médecin  
 Robert Moor as Un médecin  
 Michèle Béryl as La vendeuse  
 Robert Pizani as Illusio

References

Bibliography 
 Crisp, Colin. French Cinema—A Critical Filmography: Volume 1, 1929-1939. Indiana University Press, 2015.

External links 
 

1938 comedy films
French comedy films
1938 films
1930s French-language films
Films directed by Dominique Bernard-Deschamps
French black-and-white films
1930s French films